Anastasia Salina (born ) is a Russian volleyball player. She was part of the Russia women's national volleyball team.

She participated in the 2013 FIVB Volleyball World Grand Prix.
On club level she played for Uralochka-UGMK in 2013.

References

External links
 Profile at FIVB.org

1988 births
Living people
Russian women's volleyball players
Place of birth missing (living people)
Universiade medalists in volleyball
Universiade gold medalists for Russia
Medalists at the 2013 Summer Universiade
20th-century Russian women
21st-century Russian women